Xime is a 1994 Bissau-Guinean drama film directed by Sana Na N'Hada.

Plot
In the early 1960s, in the village of Xime in Guinea-Bissau, Iala, the father of Raul and Bedan, is worried about his two sons. The eldest, Raul, animated by desires of revolt, has joined the liberation movement, unknown to anyone. He is wanted by the Portuguese colonial authorities while he studies at a seminary in Bissau. Bedan, the younger of the two, a turbulent young man still a teenager, is almost at the age where he must reluctantly submit to the traditional coming-of-age rituals. One of these is dressing in women's clothing. Bedan is also admiring his father's young fiance. In the end, Raul is fatally wounded and stumbles to the wedding, and Bedan joins the revolutionary cause.

Cast
Aful Macka  : Iala
Justino Neto  : Raul
José Tamba  : Bedan
Etelvina Gomes  : N'dai
Juan Carlos Tajes  : Cunha
Jacqueline Camara
Saene Nanque
Namba Na Nfadan

Production
This was only the fourth film to be produced in Guinea-Bissau. It was a French-Dutch co-production. It was the first film to be directed by Sana Na N'Hada, although he collaborated on several short films with Flora Gomes. It was a semi-autobiographical work, and he returned to Guinea-Bissau to film it after studying in Cuba.

Release and reception
Xime was screened at the Cannes Film Festival, in the Un Certain Regard category. It received the Special Jury Prize at the Festival international du film d'Amiens. Xime also received the Special Jury Prize at the 
Festival International du Premier Film D'Annonay.
The film was awarded the Intercultural Communication Prize for a Feature Film at the 1995 Vues d'Afrique festival in Montreal.

Deborah Young of Variety.com was very praiseful of the film. She wrote that it "interests not only for its rare locale but for a fresh approach to historical storytelling" from N'Hada, while the "film's intentions are ambitious, and its black characters are interestingly three-dimensional."

References

External links 
 Xime at the Internet Movie Database

1994 films
Bissau-Guinean films
1994 drama films
1990s English-language films